Lou Levy may refer to:

Lou Levy (publisher) (1912–1995), American music publisher who played a key role in the careers of some of the most famous songwriters
Lou Levy (pianist) (1928–2001), American jazz pianist and session man, best known for his bebop and cool-jazz-based playing style 
Louis Levy (1894–1957), English composer and musical director of Gaumont-British studios